Gerald Lee Alexanderson (1933–2020) was an American mathematician. He was the Michael & Elizabeth Valeriote Professor of Science at Santa Clara University, and in 1997–1998 was president of the Mathematical Association of America. He was also president of The Fibonacci Association from 1980 to 1984.

Education and career
Alexanderson did his undergraduate studies at the University of Oregon, graduating with a B.A. in 1955. He earned a master's degree from Stanford University in 1958, and in the same year joined the Santa Clara University faculty. At Santa Clara, he chaired the department of mathematics for 35 years, from 1967 to 2002.

He was the co-author, editor, or co-editor of 15 books, and was editor of Mathematics Magazine from 1986 to 1990. Abraham Hillman was his most frequent co-author.

Awards and honors
In 2005, Alexanderson won both the Deborah and Franklin Haimo Awards for Distinguished College or University Teaching of Mathematics, and the Yueh-Gin Gung and Dr. Charles Y. Hu Award for Distinguished Service to Mathematics, both from the Mathematical Association of America.

Selected publications

as author
 with Abraham Hillman: 
 with Abraham Hillman:  4 editions
 with Abraham Hillman:  7 editions
 with Abraham Hillman:  16 editions
 with Donald J. Albers and Constance Reid: ;  29 editions
 with Abraham Hillman and Richard M. Grassi:  8 editions

as editor
 with Donald J. Albers:   26 editions
 with Leonard F. Klosinski and Loren C. Larson:   25 editions
  15 editions
 with Donald J. Albers and Constance Reid:  13 editions
 with Dale H. Mugler:  15 editions (See Ralph P. Boas Jr.)
 
 with Donald J. Albers:  18 editions
 with Tatiana Shubin and David Hayes: 
 
 with Donald J. Albers and William Dunham:

References

External links
Home page

1933 births
2020 deaths
20th-century American mathematicians
21st-century American mathematicians
University of Oregon alumni
Stanford University alumni
Santa Clara University faculty